Pokrov is a rural locality (a selo) in Abakanovskoye Rural Settlement, Cherepovetsky District, Vologda Oblast, Russia. The population was 5 as of 2002. There are 4 streets.

Geography 
Zhdanovskaya is the nearest rural locality.

References 

Rural localities in Cherepovetsky District